Maniitsoq, formerly Sukkertoppen, is a town in Maniitsoq Island, western Greenland located in the Qeqqata municipality. With 2,534 inhabitants , it is the sixth-largest town in Greenland.

History 
Archaeological finds indicate that the area has been settled for more than 4,000 years.

The modern town was founded as New or Nye-Sukkertoppen in 1782 by Danish colonists relocating from the original Sukkertoppen, a trading post founded in 1755 at the site of present-day Kangaamiut. In time, the original name was taken up again.

In the 19th century, the town served as a major trading post for the Royal Greenland Trading Department's trade in reindeer hides.

Maniitsoq Municipality was a former municipality of Greenland. It is now part of Qeqqata Municipality.

Industry 
There have been plans for an Alcoa aluminium smelting plant either at Maniitsoq or Sisimiut for an extended period, at  least since 2008, without progressing to construction.  The plant would provide employment for 600–700 people, or more than 1 percent of the population of Greenland. As it is a vital decision for the town, wide public consultations were carried out in 2008–2010 by both the town authorities and the Greenland Home Rule Government in order to address potential environmental and social concerns.

Transport

Air 

Maniitsoq is served by Air Greenland with flights to Nuuk, Kangerlussuaq, and Sisimiut.

Sea 
Maniitsoq is a port of call for the Arctic Umiaq ferry.

Population 
With 2,534 inhabitants , Maniitsoq has experienced a decline in population over a long period of time. The town has lost almost 15% of its population relative to 1990 levels, and nearly 9% relative to 2000 levels.

Migrants from the smaller settlements such as rapidly depopulating Kangaamiut choose to migrate to Sisimiut, the capital in Nuuk, and sometimes to Denmark, rather than Maniitsoq. Kangerlussuaq and Sisimiut are the only settlement in the Qeqqata municipality exhibiting stable growth patterns over the last two decades.

Notable people

 Germaine Arnaktauyok (b. 1946), Inuk printmaker, painter, and drawer
 Mimi Karlsen (b. 1957), politician
Sofie Petersen (b. 1955), Lutheran Bishop of Greenland
Rasmus Lyberth (b. 1951), singer, actor
Thue Christiansen (1940–2022), designer of the Greenlandic flag, artist

Literature
The novel The Prophets of Eternal Fjord by Kim Leine is set in Sukkertoppen.

Maniitsoq Structure

However, the Maniitsoq structure has not been widely recognised as an impact structure, and the proposal was criticised for not meeting established criteria for recognising impact craters. Subsequent studies in the region have found no evidence for an impact structure, and a number of observations that directly contradict the earlier impact structure proposals. The Maniitsoq structure is not recognised as an impact structure by the Earth Impact Database.

Twin towns – sister cities
Maniitsoq is twinned with:

 Esbjerg, Denmark
 Salzburg, Austria

References 

Davis Strait
Populated places in Greenland
Populated places established in 1755
Qeqqata
1755 establishments in North America
18th-century establishments in Greenland